Matthew McNamara (born 16 July 1996) is an America soccer player who plays as a defender for Rio Branco-ES.

Career

Before the second half of 2019–20, McNamara signed for Albanian side Turbina, where he made 3 league appearances and scored 1 goal. On 1 February 2020, he debuted for Turbina during a 1–2 loss to Devolli. On 29 February 2020, McNamara scored his first goal for Turbina during a 1–5 loss to Pogradeci.

In 2020, he signed for Jarabacoa in the Dominican Republic. Before the 2022 season, McNamara signed for Brazilian club Rio Branco-ES.

References

External links
Matt McNamara at playmakerstats.com

1996 births
Kategoria e Parë players
American expatriate soccer players
American expatriate sportspeople in Albania
American expatriate sportspeople in Brazil
American expatriate sportspeople in the Dominican Republic
American soccer players
Association football defenders
Don Bosco Jarabacoa FC players
Elmhurst College alumni
Expatriate footballers in Albania
Expatriate footballers in Brazil
Expatriate footballers in the Dominican Republic
KF Turbina players
Living people
Soccer players from Ohio